Virginian has been the name of several ships:
 
, a tug in commission from 1918 to 1919
, a troop transport in commission in 1919
 , a steam turbine powered transatlantic ocean liner, launched in 1904 for the Allan Line. She operated from 1920 to 1948 for the Swedish American Line as SS Drottningholm.

See also
 Virginian (disambiguation)
 

Ship names